Pseudomonas coenobios is a Gram-negative, non-sporulating, motile, rod marine bacterium. The type strain is ATCC 14402.

References

Pseudomonadales
Bacteria described in 1944